McCook is a surname. Notable people with the surname include:

 Brian Joseph McCook (1982-present), an American drag queen  
John McCook (1945-present), actor
 Tommy McCook, Jamaican saxophonist
 "The Fighting McCooks"
 Daniel McCook (1798-1863), killed in action during US Civil War
 Robert Latimer McCook (1827-1862), US general, killed during US Civil War, son of Daniel
 Alexander McDowell McCook (1831-1903), US general, son of Daniel
 John James McCook (lawyer) (b. 1845), soldier and lawyer, son Daniel
 Daniel McCook, Jr. (1834-1864) soldier, killed in action during US Civil War, son of Daniel
 Edwin S. McCook, (1837-1873), Governor of Dakota Territory son of Dan
 John James McCook, served in Civil war, brother of Daniel
 Edward Moody McCook (1833-1909), soldier and governor, son of John
 Anson George McCook (b. 1835), politician, son of John
 Henry Christopher McCook (1837-1911), clergyman and naturalist, son of John
 John James McCook (professor) (b. 1843), clergyman and professor, son of John
 Roderick McCook (1839-1886), U.S. Naval officer, son of John

See also
Laurette Spang-McCook, American actress